E. Verner Nielsen (23 May 1899 – 12 December 1981), was a Danish chess player.

Biography
In 1919, in Copenhagen in simultaneous exhibition E. Verner Nielsen won the World Chess Champion Emanuel Lasker.  From 1925 to 1956 he was multiple participant of the Danish Chess Championships. His best result - 4th place in 1947 and 1949.

E. Verner Nielsen played for Denmark in the Chess Olympiad:
 In 1954, at fourth board in the 11th Chess Olympiad in Amsterdam (+3, =1, -1).

In his mature years he played actively correspondence chess.

References

External links

E. Verner Nielsen chess games at 365chess.com

1899 births
1981 deaths
Danish chess players
Chess Olympiad competitors
20th-century chess players